Lena Philipsson Collection, is a 2001 compilation album by Swedish pop singer Lena Philipsson. It peaked at #13 at the Swedish album chart.

Track listing
"Fly Me Over the Rainbow"
"Boy"
"Kärleken är evig"
"Åh Amadeus"
"Jag känner (Ti Sento)"
"Dansa i neon"
"Det går väl an"
"Saknar dig innan du går"
"Om igen"
"Talking in Your Sleep"
"I'm a Fool"
"Jag kan jag vill"
"Tänd ett ljus"
"Teach Me Tiger"
"Standing in My Rain"
"Why (Så lätt kommer du inte undan)"
"My Name"
"Taking-Care Day"
"006"
"Macho Male"
"The Murder"
"The Preacher"
"Give Me Your Love"
"Månsken i augusti"
"Stjärnorna"
"Kärlek kommer med sommar"
"Vila hos mig"
"Bästa vänner"
"I Believe in Miracles"

Chart positions

References

2001 compilation albums
Lena Philipsson compilation albums